Bessonovka is a rural locality (a selo) and the administrative center of Bessonovsky District, Penza Oblast, Russia. Population:

References

Notes

Sources

Rural localities in Bessonovsky District
Penzensky Uyezd